Arroz Caldoso is a dish which originated in Spain. It literally means "brothy rice" and consists of broth (bouillon) and rice with diverse flavourings and extra ingredients. The recipe is quite varied depending in which region of the Iberian peninsula it is prepared. Variations of this dish range from a recipe quite similar to Italian risotto, to a rice soup, to a dish that could be mistaken for paella.

Base components

Caldoso always contains broth of any meat, some garlic and/or onions and short grain rice. Many recipes call for caramelised onions and in some recipes a small quantity of lentils are thrown in to help thicken the caldoso and add flavour.

Caldoso with sea food

This version calls for the addition of smoked paprika (pimenton) and one's choice of sea food (usually mussels, shrimp or clams) and extra water, which leaves it in a semi-liquid state. When served, the sea food is presented on top of the rice.

Caldoso with mushrooms

The mushroom variety calls for wild mushrooms (setas) to be fried separately from the caldoso. A cup of wine, sherry, port or dark beer and a small handful of red lentils are added to the caldoso while cooking. The rice is cooked until little liquid remains. Saffron or a strong cheese is added at the last moment and it is served by placing the separately fried mushrooms on top of the rice.

Caldoso with meat

Cubes of meat are added to the caldoso as well as extra liquid (water or sherry) as well as smoked paprika or a spice of ones choice. It is served quite liquid.

See also
Arroz caldo

References

Spanish rice dishes